Khara-Usun (Khara uhan) is a rural locality (an ulus) in Barguzinsky District, Republic of Buryatia, Russia. The population was 127 as of 2010. There is 1 street.

Geography 
Khara-Usun is located 85 km northeast of Barguzin (the district's administrative centre) by road. Soyol is the nearest rural locality.

References 

Rural localities in Barguzinsky District